Gholam-Hossein Esmaeili (Persian: غلامحسین اسماعیلی, born 1965) is an Iranian lawyer and politician. He is chief of staff of the president of Iran from 8 August 2021.

He was Spokesman of Judicial system of the Islamic Republic of Iran from 2019 until 2021.
He served as Tehran Province’s chief justice from 24 April 2014 until 4 August 2019.

References

1965 births
Living people
20th-century Iranian lawyers
21st-century Iranian judges
Presidential aides of Iran